"Blank Space" is a song by American singer-songwriter Taylor Swift, taken from her fifth studio album, 1989. The song was released to US radio stations as the second single from 1989 on November 10, 2014, by Republic Records in partnership with Big Machine. Swift co-wrote "Blank Space" with its producers Max Martin and Shellback. For the lyrics, she conceived the song as a satirical self-referential nod to her reputation as a flirtatious woman with a series of romantic attachments, which blemished her once-wholesome girl next door image. Musically, it is an electropop song with minimal hip hop-influenced beats.

"Blank Space" spent seven weeks atop the US Billboard Hot 100 and was certified eight times platinum by the Recording Industry Association of America (RIAA). It also topped charts in Australia, Canada, Iceland, Scotland, and South Africa. The International Federation of the Phonographic Industry (IFPI) reported that "Blank Space" was one of the best-selling singles of 2015. Critics praised the song's production and Swift's songwriting; some picked it as 1989 highlight. The song earned three nominations at the 58th Grammy Awards, including two general categories: Record of the Year and Song of the Year. It featured on decade-end lists by such publications as Billboard, Rolling Stone, and Slant Magazine.

Joseph Kahn directed the music video for "Blank Space", which depicts Swift as a jealous woman who acts erratically upon suspecting her boyfriend's infidelity. Photography took place mostly at Oheka Castle, with a few additional scenes shot at Woolworth Estate. The video won Best Pop Video and Best Female Video at the 2015 MTV Video Music Awards. Swift included "Blank Space" on the set lists for three of her concert tours: the 1989 World Tour (2015), Reputation Stadium Tour (2018), and the Eras Tour (2023). The song has been adapted into cover versions of different genres by several rock musicians, including I Prevail and Ryan Adams.

Background 
Inspired by 1980s synth-pop with synthesizers, drum pads, and overlapped vocals, Taylor Swift decided to move away from the signature country styles of her previous releases and incorporate a straightforward pop production for her fifth studio album, 1989, which was released in 2014. The recording process began in mid-2013 concurrently with the start of Swift's headlining world tour in support of her fourth studio album Red. On 1989, Swift and Swedish producer Max Martin served as executive producers. Martin and his frequent collaborator Shellback produced seven out of 13 songs on the album's standard edition.

Having been known as "America's Sweetheart" thanks to her wholesome and down-to-earth girl next door image, Swift saw her reputation blemished due to her history of romantic relationships with a series of high-profile celebrities. The New York Times asserted in 2013 that her "dating history [had] begun to stir what feels like the beginning of a backlash", questioning whether Swift was in the midst of a quarter-life crisis. The Tampa Bay Times observed that until the release of 1989, Swift's love life had become a fixed tabloid interest and overshadowed her musicianship. Swift disliked the media portrayal of her as a "serial-dater", feeling that it undermined her professional works, and became reticent to discuss her personal life in public. The tabloid scrutiny on her image prompted her to write satirical songs about her perceived image, in addition to her traditional romantic themes.

Lyrics and music 

Talking to GQ in 2015, Swift said that she envisioned "Blank Space" to be a satirical self-referential nod to the media perception of her image as "a girl who's crazy but seductive but glamorous but nuts but manipulative". She admitted that she had felt personally attacked for a long time before realizing "it was kind of hilarious". She co-wrote the song with its producers, Max Martin and Shellback.

"Blank Space" follows the verse–chorus song structure. The lyrics in the verses are clipped, "Magic, madness, heaven, sin," setting a mysterious and dreadful tone. At one point, Swift describes herself as a "nightmare dressed like a daydream". The refrain alludes to Swift's songwriting practice taking inspiration from her love life; the lyrics, "Got a long list of ex-lovers / They'll tell you I'm insane / But I've got a blank space, baby," are followed by a brief silence and then a clicking pen sound, "And I'll write your name." The line "Got a long list of ex-lovers" is often misheard as "All the lonely Starbucks lovers," prompting internet discussions including a response from Starbucks themselves upon the song's release.

Swift told NME in 2015 that when "Blank Space" was released, she noted, "Half the people got the joke, half the people really think that I was like really owning the fact that I'm a psychopath". Music scholar Nate Sloan analyzed that the narrator of "Blank Space" is unreliable, and therefore it is open to interpretation whether it is a true portrayal of Swift's character or not. In contemporary publications, journalists commented that the track represented 1989 lighthearted view on failed relationships, departing from the notion of idealized romance on Swift's past albums. Others noted that Swift made fun of her image and the media discourse surrounding her celebrity, which later served as the foundation for her 2017 studio album Reputation (2017), which explores her public experiences and the media gossip.

Martin and Shellback employed a sparse production for "Blank Space" as Swift wanted the song to emphasize the lyrics and vocals. Musically, "Blank Space" is an electropop song that is set over minimal hip hop-influenced beats. The song incorporates synthesizers, percussioned guitar strums, and layered backing vocals. The track builds up in the refrain, where Swift sings in her higher register. Some contemporary critics compared the song's minimal production to that of New Zealand singer-songwriter Lorde's music, specifically her 2013 album Pure Heroine.<ref name="Spin">{{cite web|last=Unterberger|first=Andrew|date=October 28, 2014|url=https://www.spin.com/2014/10/taylor-swift-new-album-1989-review/|title=Taylor Swift Gets Clean, Hits Reset on New Album 1989'''|work=Spin|archive-url=https://web.archive.org/web/20181119025551/https://www.spin.com/2014/10/taylor-swift-new-album-1989-review/|archive-date=November 19, 2018|access-date=April 5, 2018|url-status=live}}</ref> Spins Andrew Unterberger commented that, as with the rest of 1989, "Blank Space" embraces 1980s pop music authenticity while incorporating a modern twist. Baesley thought that the minimal production may "sound bright and easy, but it's anything but the latter to create", calling it "weapons-grade, professional pop".

 Release and commercial performance 
Republic Records in partnership with Swift's then-label Big Machine announced in late October 2014 that "Blank Space" would serve as the second single from 1989, following the lead single "Shake It Off" in August. The song impacted US rhythmic crossover radio on November 10, 2014. The following day, Republic and Big Machine promoted the song to US hot adult contemporary and contemporary hit radio. A CD single version of "Blank Space" was released in Germany on January 2, 2015, by Universal Music Group.

"Blank Space" debuted at number 18 on the US Billboard Hot 100 on the chart dated November 15, 2014. The single reached number one in its third week on the chart, supported by the release of its music video. It took the number-one position from 1989 lead single "Shake It Off", making Swift the first and to date, the only woman ever in Billboard Hot 100 chart history to succeed herself at the top spot. "Blank Space" remained atop the Billboard Hot 100 for seven consecutive weeks. As of July 2019, "Blank Space" has sold 4.6 million copies in the United States. The Recording Industry Association of America (RIAA) certified the single 8× Platinum, which denotes eight million units based on sales and track-equivalent on-demand streams.

The single also reached number one in Australia, Canada, South Africa, and Scotland. It peaked atop the Euro Digital Song Sales, a Billboard component chart, and the Finnish Download Chart. "Blank Space" charted within the top five of national record charts, at number two in New Zealand, Poland, Slovakia, number three in Bulgaria, number four in the Czech Republic, Ireland, Israel, the UK, and number five in Lebanon. It received multi-platinum certifications in Australia (8× Platinum), Canada (4× Platinum), and the UK (2× Platinum). According to the International Federation of the Phonographic Industry (IFPI), the song was the eighth best-selling song of 2015, with 9.2 million track-equivalent units.

Critical reception
The song received critical acclaim. Upon the release of 1989, Shane Kimberline of musicOMH called "Blank Space" one of the album's best songs. PopMatters Corey Baesley lauded it as "easily a candidate for the best pop song of 2014". Sydney Gore from The 405 deemed "Blank Space" the album's highlight, and Aimee Cliff from Fact labeled it one of Swift's "most enjoyable songs to date" for portraying Swift's love life in a larger-than-life manner. Drowned in Sound Robert Leedham wrote that Swift succeeded in experimenting with new musical styles on 1989, specifically choosing "Blank Space" as an example.The Observer critic Kitty Empire picked "Blank Space" as a song that showcased Swift's musical and lyrical maturity, calling it "an out-and-out pop song with an intriguingly skeletal undercarriage". Writing for the Los Angeles Times, Mikael Wood selected the track as one of the album's better songs because of Swift's songwriting craftsmanship. The New York Times critic Jon Caramanica deemed the song "Swift at her peak" that "serves to assert both her power and her primness". The Independents Andy Gill was less enthusiastic, calling it a "corporate rebel clichéd" song.

Retrospective reviews of "Blank Space" have been positive. Critic Alexis Petridis of The Guardian in 2019 declared "Blank Space" the best single Swift had released, praising its success in transforming Swift's image from a country singer-songwriter to a pop star thanks to its "effortless" melody and witty lyrics. Rolling Stone reviewer Rob Sheffield wrote: "Every second of 'Blank Space' is perfect." Paste in 2020 described the song as "remarkably well-made, infectiously catchy, and legitimately funny", and named it the best song on 1989. Selja Rankin from Entertainment Weekly also dubbed "Blank Space" the best track on the album, praising the over-the-top lyrics and its catchy 1980s pop sound.

 Accolades Rolling Stone ranked "Blank Space" sixth on their list of the best songs of 2014, 73rd on their list of the best songs of the 2010s decade, and 357th on their list of the greatest songs of all time. Time named it as the ninth best song in their year-end list. The song placed at number three on The Village Voices annual year-end Pazz & Jop critics' poll of 2014. Stereogum and Uproxx ranked the song at numbers 49 and 72 on their lists of the best songs of the 2010s decade, respectively. Billboard named it one of the 100 "Songs That Defined the Decade". Katie Atkinson wrote that the single consolidated Swift's trademark autobiographical storytelling in music while "setting the standard for a new, self-aware pop star" in poking fun at her perceived image. On Slant Magazine list of the 100 best singles of the 2010s, "Blank Space" ranked 15th. In 2021, Rolling Stone placed the song at number 357 on its list of 500 Greatest Songs of All Time.

"Blank Space" won Song of the Year at the 2015 American Music Awards. At the 2016 BMI Awards, the song was one of the Award-Winning Songs that helped Swift earn the honor Songwriter of the Year. It earned a nomination for International Work of the Year at the 2015 APRA Awards in Australia. At the 58th Annual Grammy Awards in 2016, "Blank Space" was nominated in three categories—Record of the Year, Song of the Year, and Best Pop Solo Performance.

Music video
Development and release

Joseph Kahn directed the music video for "Blank Space". Swift approached Kahn with the idea for treatment, desiring the video to portray her self-deprecation as a "crazy villain" akin to the lyrics. According to Kahn, Swift envisioned "Blank Space" as "a video addressing this concept of, if she has so many boys breaking up with her maybe the problem isn't the boy, maybe the problem is her". Photography took place at two locations in Long Island: primary shooting took place at Oheka Castle, with a few additional scenes shot at Woolworth Estate. The video was shot over three days in September 2014; the last day was dedicated to film American Express Unstaged: Taylor Swift Experience, an interactive 360° mobile app in collaboration with American Express. For the video, Swift was thorough in choosing the concepts and imagery. Kahn spoke of his working experience with Swift on Mashable: "When you have an artist wanting to test her imaging, it's always great territory to be in".

Kahn took inspirations from Stanley Kubrick's 1971 film A Clockwork Orange for the video's symmetrical framing style, calling it "a really funny way to approach a pop video". The video begins as Swift's love interest (played by model Sean O'Pry) drives a Shelby AC Cobra towards Swift's mansion. Upon arrival, he and Swift quickly become a loving couple. They engage in various romantic activities together, dancing, painting a portrait for the boyfriend, walking along the estate grounds, and riding horses into the woods. Halfway through the video, Swift notices him texting someone, and the couple begins to fall apart. They begin to fight, and Swift shows erratic behaviors such as throwing vases, slashing the painted portrait, and burning her boyfriend's clothes, which drives him to end the relationship. At a high point, Swift uses a golf club to destroy her boyfriend's car, a reference to Tiger Woods' 2009 cheating scandal. As the boyfriend leaves the estate, a new man (played by Andrea Denver) approaches, offering Swift a new hope for love.

Swift planned to premiere to the video on Good Morning America on November 11, 2014, but Yahoo! accidentally leaked it a day before. Swift posted the video onto her Vevo account quickly after the leak. The interactive app American Express Unstaged: Taylor Swift Experience, featuring the 360° video version of "Blank Space", was released concurrently. The user can choose to either follow Swift and her love interest throughout the linear storyline, or leave the storyline to explore other rooms in the mansion and find interactive easter eggs, such as Swift's childhood photos. The app was available for free on mobile app stores. Kahn talked to Rolling Stone that the app was created with "superfans" who wanted to "feel even closer to Swift" in mind.

 Reception 
Upon release, media outlets compared the narrative of the video to that of Gone Girl, in the sense that both Swift and Gone Girl protagonist "[strip] away the romantic sheen she's given all her relationships in the past". Randall Roberts from the Los Angeles Times wrote that Swift delivered an "Oscar-worthy" performance. Billboard praised the video's cinematic quality and aesthetics, and found Swift's self-referential portrayal amusing, which served as "icing on the blood-filled cake". Columnist Jessica Valenti from The Guardian complimented Swift's portrayal of her perceived image and dubbed the video "a feminist daydream", where "the narrow and sexist caricatures attached to women are acted out for our amusement, their full ridiculousness on display".USA Today in 2017 named the video Swift's best music video up to date, calling it a "pure 'art' form". Spin also dubbed it the greatest video Swift had done so far, praising the video's combination of glamorous aesthetics and hilarious depiction of Swift's reputation. Entertainment Weekly in 2020 picked "Blank Space" as the best video among 1989 singles, describing it as "the only music video that can be earnestly described as 'Kubrickian'." The video for "Blank Space" won Best Pop Video and Best Female Video at the 2015 MTV Video Music Awards. It earned a nomination for Best International Female Video at the MTV Video Music Awards Japan. The American Express Unstaged: Taylor Swift Experience app won Original Interactive Program at the 67th Primetime Creative Arts Emmy Awards. Rolling Stone placed "Blank Space" at number 67 on its list of 100 greatest music videos of all time.

Live performances and other versions

Swift performed "Blank Space" during the "1989 Secret Session", live streamed by Yahoo! and iHeartRadio on October 27, 2014. Swift premiered the song on television at the 2014 American Music Awards, where she recreated the narrative of the music video, acting as a psychopathic woman who acts erratically towards her boyfriend. She again performed the song on The Voice on November 25, at the 2014 Victoria's Secret Fashion Show on December 2, and during Capital FM's Jingle Bell Ball 2014 in London, broadcast on December 5.

On February 25, 2015, Swift opened the 2015 Brit Awards with a rendition of "Blank Space". At the beginning of the performance, Swift sang the song in front of a white background featuring silhouettes of backup dancers. The song was part of the set lists for two of Swift's concert tours—the 1989 World Tour (2015) and Reputation Stadium Tour (2018). On September 9, 2019, Swift performed the song at the City of Lover one-off concert in Paris, France. She performed the song again at the We Can Survive charity concert on October 19, 2019, in Los Angeles. At the 2019 American Music Awards, where Swift was honored Artist of the Decade, she performed "Blank Space" as part of a medley of her hits. She again performed the song at Capital FM's Jingle Bell Ball 2019 in London, and at iHeartRadio Z100's Jingle Ball 2019 in New York City. The song was performed on the Eras Tour (2023).

Following the song's debut at the 2014 American Music Awards, rapper Pitbull uploaded a remix featuring his rap verse to SoundCloud on December 15, 2014. Retro music group Postmodern Jukebox transformed the song into a 1940s-inspired track in their cover. Rock band Imagine Dragons performed a slowed down rendition of the song sampling Ben E. King's "Stand by Me" at BBC Radio 1 Live Lounge in February 2015. Metalcore band I Prevail released a post-hardcore cover of "Blank Space" as their debut single in December 2014. The cover reached number nine on Billboard Hot Rock Songs and number 90 on the Billboard Hot 100, and received a platinum certification by the RIAA, which denotes one million track-equivalent units.

Rock singer Ryan Adams covered "Blank Space" on his 2015 track-by-track cover album of Swift's 1989. On his rendition, Adams incorporated stripped-down, acoustic string instruments, contrasting the original's electronic production. Indie singer Father John Misty released a cover version of the song in the style of the rock band the Velvet Underground in 2015. The cover is a reinterpretation of Adams's version and is built on the melody of the song "I'm Waiting for the Man".

Credits and personnel
Credits are adapted from 1989'' album liner notes.

 Taylor Swift – vocals, background vocals, songwriter, shouts
 Max Martin – producer, songwriter, keyboards, programming
 Shellback – producer, songwriter, acoustic guitar, electric guitar, bass, keyboards, percussion, programming, shouts, stomps
 Michael Ilbert – audio recording
 Sam Holland – recording
 Cory Bice – recording assistant
 Serban Ghenea – mixing
 John Hanes – mixing engineer
 Tom Coyne – mastering

Charts

Weekly charts

Year-end charts

Decade-end charts

All-time charts

Certifications

Release history

See also
 List of Billboard Hot 100 number ones of 2014
 List of Billboard Hot 100 number ones of 2015
 List of Billboard Adult Contemporary number ones of 2015
 List of Canadian Hot 100 number-one singles of 2014
 List of number-one singles of 2014 (Australia)
 List of number-one singles of 2015 (South Africa)
 List of most-viewed YouTube videos

Footnotes

References

Sources

External links
 American Express Unstaged: Taylor Swift Experience on American Express

2014 songs
2014 singles
Billboard Hot 100 number-one singles
Borderline personality disorder in fiction
I Prevail songs
Canadian Hot 100 number-one singles
Music videos directed by Joseph Kahn
Number-one singles in Iceland
Number-one singles in Scotland
Satirical songs
Song recordings produced by Max Martin
Song recordings produced by Shellback (record producer)
Songs written by Max Martin
Songs written by Shellback (record producer)
Songs written by Taylor Swift
Taylor Swift songs
South African Airplay Chart number-one singles
MTV Video Music Award for Best Female Video
Ryan Adams songs